Tang-e Daf (also known as Tankedaf) is a village in Surak Rural District, Lirdaf District, Jask County, Hormozgan Province, Iran. At the 2006 census, its population was 30, in 9 families.

References 

Populated places in Jask County